Ivy Hill Cemetery may refer to:
Ivy Hill Cemetery (Maryland)
Ivy Hill Cemetery (Philadelphia)
Ivy Hill Cemetery (Alexandria, Virginia)
Ivy Hill Cemetery (Smithfield, Virginia)